The 2016 Northwest Territories Men's Curling Championship was held from January 27 to 31 at the Hay River Curling Club in Hay River. The winning Jamie Koe team represented the Northwest Territories at the 2016 Tim Hortons Brier in Ottawa.

Teams
The teams are listed as follows:

Round-robin standings

Round-robin results

January 27
Draw 1
P. Delorey 6-4 McArthur
Koe 10-2 D. Delorey
Moss 19-9 Hudy

Draw 2
Hudy 10-2 D. Delorey
Skauge 6-5 Moss
Koe 9-3 P. Delorey

January 28
Draw 3
Moss 10-4 McArthur
P. Delorey 6-5 Hudy
Skauge 8-4 D. Delorey

Draw 4
Skauge 10-5 P. Delorey
D. Delorey 8-6 McArthur
Koe 9-3 Moss

January 29
Draw 5
Moss 10-2 D. Delorey
Koe 9-3 Hudy
Skauge 8-2 McArthur

Draw 6
Koe 5-4 Skauge
Moss 10-2 P. Delorey
Hudy 7-5 McArthur

January 30
Draw 7
Skauge 9-2 Hudy
Koe 8-4 McArthur
P. Delorey 10-8 D. Delorey

Final
Koe must be beaten twice

Sunday, January 31, 1:00 pm

External links
Scores

2016 Tim Hortons Brier
Curling in the Northwest Territories
South Slave Region
2016 in the Northwest Territories